Harris is an unincorporated community in North Township, Marshall County, Indiana.

Harris was originally called Harris Station; it contained a depot on the Vandalia Railroad.

Geography

References

Unincorporated communities in Marshall County, Indiana
Unincorporated communities in Indiana